Tilbury Town is a fictional American town which serves as the location for many works by the American poet Edwin Arlington Robinson.

The small New England village was modeled after Gardiner, Maine where Robinson grew up.

References

Fictional populated places in the United States
Gardiner, Maine